V 305 Ostpreussen was a German fishing trawler that was requistioned in the Second World War by the Kriegsmarine for use as a vorpostenboot and later a Vorpostensicherungsboot. She was returned to her owners post war. In 1957, she was re-engined, converted to a cargo ship and renamed Stella Maris. Sold to the Netherlands that year, she was scrapped in 1958.

Description
The engine was built by Deschimag Seebeckwerft, Wesermünde, Germany. It was rated at 93nhp.

History
Ostpreussen was built at yard number 526 by Deschimag Seebeckwerft, Wesermünde for the Nordsee Deutsche Hochseefischerei AG, Cuxhaven. She was launched in June 1935 and completed on 15 July. The fishing boat registration PG 487 was allocated, as were the Code Letters DFCB.

On 30 September 1939, Ostpreussen was requistioned by the Kriegsmarine for use as a vorpostenboot. She was allocated to 3 Vorpostenflotille as V 305 Ostpreussen. On 15 February 1944, she was redesignated as a Vorpostensicherungsboot serving with 5 Vorpostensicherungsflotille as Vs 518 Ostpreussen.

Ostpreussen was returned to her owners post-war. In 1948, her registration was changed to BX 345. In January 1957, she was sold to F. Hansen, Emden, West Germany and renamed Stella Maris. In that year, a diesel engine was fitted and she was converted to a cargo ship. In March 1957, she was sold to Dutch owners. She was scrapped in the Netherlands in May 1958.

References

Sources

1935 ships
Ships built in Bremen (state)
Fishing vessels of Germany
Steamships of Germany
World War II merchant ships of Germany
Auxiliary ships of the Kriegsmarine
Maritime incidents in January 1941
Fishing vessels of West Germany
Steamships of West Germany
Merchant ships of the Netherlands